Ida Karjalainen (born 11 April 1997) is a Finnish ice hockey player who currently plays with Kärpät Naiset of the Naisten Liiga and with the Finnish national team.

Karjalainen was officially named to the Finnish roster for the 2020 IIHF Women's World Championship on 4 March 2020, prior to the IIHF canceling the tournament on 7 March 2020 in response to public health concerns related to COVID-19. She has previously appeared on the national team roster at various Euro Hockey Tour tournaments in the 2018–19 and 2019–20 seasons.

References

External links 

Living people
1997 births
Sportspeople from Oulu
Finnish women's ice hockey forwards
Oulun Kärpät Naiset players
HPK Kiekkonaiset players
Ilves Naiset players